In molecular biology, the trappin protein transglutaminase binding domain or cementoin is a protein domain found at the N-terminus of Whey Acidic Protein (WAP) domain-containing protease inhibitors such as trappin-2. This N-terminal domain enables it to become cross-linked to extracellular matrix proteins by transglutaminase. This domain contains several repeated motifs with the consensus sequence Gly-Gln-Asp-Pro-Val-Lys, and these together can anchor the whole molecule to extracellular matrix proteins, such as laminin, fibronectin, beta-crystallin, collagen IV, fibrinogen, and elastin, by transglutaminase-catalysed cross-links. The whole domain is rich in glutamine and lysine, thus allowing transglutaminase(s) to catalyse the formation of an intermolecular epsilon-(gamma-glutamyl)lysine isopeptide bond.

References

Protein families